Saltenia is an extinct genus of frogs. It was assigned to the family Pipidae by R. L. Carroll in 1988 and again in 2005 by A. M. Báez and T. Harrison. The single described species, Saltenia ibanezi, is thought to have lived in South America in the Late Cretaceous.

Its closest living relative are the frogs in the genus Silurana. Fossils of Saltenia have been found in the Campanian Las Curtiembres Formation of Argentina.

References

†
Late Cretaceous amphibians
Campanian life
Cretaceous amphibians of South America
Cretaceous Argentina
Fossils of Argentina
 
Fossil taxa described in 1959